"You Are My Music, You Are My Song" is a song written by David Erwin and Jim Carter, and recorded by American country music artists Charly McClain and Wayne Massey.  It was released in November 1985 as the third single from the album Radio Heart.  The song reached #10 on the Billboard Hot Country Singles & Tracks chart.

Chart performance

References

1986 singles
Charly McClain songs
Song recordings produced by Norro Wilson
Epic Records singles
1985 songs